The Pan-American Journal of Aquatic Sciences is a peer-reviewed open access scientific journal. It covers research on all aspects of the aquatic sciences. Articles are published in English, Spanish, or Portuguese.

Abstracting and indexing
The journal is abstracted and is indexed in Aquatic Sciences and Fisheries Abstracts and Scopus.

References

External links 
 

Ecology journals